Sciota adelphella is a moth of the family Pyralidae. It was described by Josef Emanuel Fischer von Röslerstamm in 1836 and is found in Europe.

The wingspan is 20–24 mm. The moth flies in one generation from mid-June to August.

The caterpillars feed on Populus alba, Salix alba and Salix repens.

Notes
The flight season refers to Belgium and the Netherlands. This may vary in other parts of the range.

External links
 waarneming.nl 
 Lepidoptera of Belgium
 Sciota adelphella on UKMoths

Moths described in 1836
Phycitini
Moths of Europe
Taxa named by Josef Emanuel Fischer von Röslerstamm